The Church Buttes is an eroded sandstone butte formation in Uinta County, Wyoming. It is notable for its prehistorical archaeological remains as well as being the location a camp site for the first party of Mormon leader Brigham Young, July 7, 1847. It was the site of one of the relays for the pony express.

The U.S. Geographic Names Information System identifies another Church Butte in Sweetwater County, Wyoming.

References

External links

Landforms of Uinta County, Wyoming
Buttes of Wyoming